Pedicia rivosa is a species of hairy-eyed cranefly in the family Pediciidae. It is found across most of Europe, but excluding the Iberian Peninsula. The subspecies P. r. mannheimsi is found in France and Germany, and some specimens from Scotland may also belong to this subspecies.

References

 

Pediciidae
Nematoceran flies of Europe
Flies described in 1758
Taxa named by Carl Linnaeus